57th edition of the tournament. Kuwait SC are the defending champions. Originally the league was structured at 8 teams but Kuwait FA announced its expansion in football so last seasons 2017–18 relegated team have been un-relegated and 2017–18 Kuwaiti Division One winners Al-Shabab SC and losing play-off team Al-Fahaheel FC will all compete this season.

Teams

Lists of teams and locations

Personnel and sponsorship

Foreign players
The total number of foreign players is restricted to five per club.

League table

Statistics

Top scorers

Best player in the season

 the first Golden One Bader Al-Mutawa.

References

External links
 
Kuwait League Fixtures and Results at FIFA
Kuwaiti League 

Kuwait Premier League seasons
Premier League
Kuwaiti Premier League